Martin Damm and Cyril Suk were the defending champions.  Damm partnered with Jared Palmer, losing in the first round.  Suk partnered with Pavel Vízner, losing in the quarterfinals.

Albert Costa and Rafael Nadal won in the final 6–3, 4–6, 6–3, against Andrei Pavel and Mikhail Youzhny.

Seeds

Draw

Draw

External links
Main Draw

2005 ATP Tour
2005 Qatar Open
Qatar Open (tennis)